Chipmunk Mountain is a mountain in southwestern British Columbia, Canada, located  southwest of Bralorne. This horn-like rocky tower is similar to The Black Tusk in Garibaldi Provincial Park.

The mountain was named in 1920 by James Landsborough after a summit party had given lunch scraps to a chipmunk.

Geology
Chipmunk Mountain is the remains of an extinct volcano that formed during the Miocene epoch. The volcanic rocks comprising Chipmunk Mountain crop out in a  area and consist of pyroclastic rocks, sills and dikes. These volcanic rocks range from basalts to rhyolites, with the majority classifying as basaltic andesites and andesites. They are closely related to the calc-alkaline volcanic centres of the Pemberton Volcanic Belt, indicating that the volcanic rocks comprising Chipmunk Mountain were created as a result of volcanism in the Canadian Cascade Arc. The volcanic rocks have been dated to be  million years old, which correlates with the time of Pemberton Belt volcanism.

See also
List of volcanoes in Canada
List of Cascade volcanoes
Volcanism of Western Canada

References

External links

Volcanoes of British Columbia
Two-thousanders of British Columbia
Pemberton Volcanic Belt
Subduction volcanoes
Miocene volcanoes
Extinct volcanoes
Pacific Ranges
Polygenetic volcanoes
Pemberton Valley